Huea is a genus of lichenized fungi in the family Lecanoraceae. It was circumscribed by Carroll William Dodge and Gladys Elizabeth Baker in 1938.

The genus name of Huea is in honour of Father Auguste-Marie Hue (1840–1917), who was a French lichenologist and clergyman.

Species
Huea albidocaerulescens 
Huea albidofusca 
Huea aspicilioidea 
Huea austroshetlandica 
Huea cerussata 
Huea comorensis 
Huea confluens 
Huea coralligera 
Huea cretacea 
Huea diphyella 
Huea flava 
Huea grisea 
Huea imponens 
Huea lactescens 
Huea leptospora 
Huea maurula 
Huea obliquans 
Huea polioterodes 
Huea punicae 
Huea sedutrix 
Huea smaragdula 
Huea sorediata 
Huea stuhlmannii 
Huea suspicax 
Huea variabilis

References

Lecanorales
Lichen genera
Lecanorales genera
Taxa described in 1938
Taxa named by Carroll William Dodge